Tippecanoe Township is one of ten townships in Marshall County, Indiana, United States. As of the 2010 census, its population was 1,313 and it contained 542 housing units.

History
Tippecanoe Township was organized in 1842. It was named from its principal stream, the Tippecanoe River.

The Erwin House, Gaskill-Erwin Farm, and Tippecanoe Twp. District No. 3 Schoolhouse and Cemetery are listed on the National Register of Historic Places.

Geography

Unincorporated towns
 Old Tip Town at 
 Tippecanoe at 
(This list is based on USGS data and may include former settlements.)

Cemeteries
The township contains two cemeteries: Tippecanoe Cemetery, and Summit Chapel Cemetery.

Major highways

School districts
 Triton School Corporation
 Argos Community Schools
 Tippecanoe Valley School Corporation

Political districts
 Indiana's 2nd congressional district
 State House District 23
 State Senate District 9

References
 
 United States Census Bureau 2008 TIGER/Line Shapefiles
 IndianaMap

External links
 Indiana Township Association
 United Township Association of Indiana
 City-Data.com page for Tippecanoe Township

Townships in Marshall County, Indiana
Townships in Indiana